The Canal de Bourbourg is a 21 km long canal which connects the river Aa (near Bourbourg) to the inner harbours of the port of Dunkerque in the Nord department, in northern France. For a short length in the middle it is part of the high-capacity waterway Liaison Dunkerque-Escaut  (Dunkirk-Scheldt Link).

See also
 List of canals in France

References

External links
 Dunkerque and canals with further maps and expanded details by the author of Inland Waterways of France including Dunkerque as an entry port into the French waterways system.
 Navigation details for 80 French rivers and canals (French waterways website section)
 Dictionnaire des Rivières et Canaux de France (in French) by Charles Berg

Bourbourg
Buildings and structures in Nord (French department)
Canals opened in 1846